Robert Resha (1920-1974) was a South African journalist and political dissident. He served in the African National Congress as a member of the Youth League and the National Executive Committee.

Early life
Robert Resha was born in Bolotwe in 1920. He completed eight years of school and then went to work as a miner.

Journalism
After acquiring a reputation for being a troublemaker, he took up freelance journalism, writing for various progressive newspapers. He moved to Johannesburg in 1940.

African National Congress

Resha joined the African National Congress in 1939, as an active member of the Youth League. He was jailed for participating in the 1952 Defiance Campaign, along with his wife Maggie Resha. For these contributions, he was accepted into the National Executive Committee in December 1952, serving as acting President in 1954-55 after a ban was placed on the former President Joe Matthews.

Resha was involved in many ANC-directed protests and strikes, including the Sophiatown Anti-Removal Campaign and the Colonial Youth Day Rally.

1956 Treason Trial

Resha was one of the accused in the 1956 Treason Trial, charged for high treason. His case was the most serious, since he had called for the "murder" of whites in a speech to the ANC National Executive. He was acquitted in March 1961. During the trial, he launched a boycott in 1959. Afterwards, he was banned from attending any ANC events and restricted to Johannesburg.

In exile
After the Treason Trial, Resha left South Africa in order to serve as an ANC ambassador, serving mainly in Algiers. He spoke as a representative of the ANC before the United Nations several times. In 1974, Resha died in exile in London.

Quotes

See also

 List of people subject to banning orders under apartheid

References

Members of the African National Congress
Apartheid in South Africa
1920 births
1973 deaths
South African journalists
Anti-apartheid activists
South African prisoners and detainees
Members of the Order of Luthuli
20th-century journalists
South African expatriates in Algeria
South African expatriates in the United Kingdom